Obereopsis atritarsis is a species of beetle in the family Cerambycidae. It was described by Maurice Pic in 1920.

References

atritarsis
Beetles described in 1920